Unzicker–Cook House is a registered historic building near Oxford, Ohio, listed in the National Register on July 24, 1974.

Historic uses 
Single dwelling
Agricultural outbuildings

Notes 

Houses on the National Register of Historic Places in Ohio
Houses in Butler County, Ohio
National Register of Historic Places in Butler County, Ohio